Blaine is an unincorporated community in Mineral County, West Virginia, United States. It is part of the Cumberland, MD-WV Metropolitan Statistical Area. It lies near the intersection of the North Branch Potomac River and West Virginia Route 42.

The community has the name of James G. Blaine, a businessperson.

References 

Unincorporated communities in Mineral County, West Virginia
Unincorporated communities in West Virginia
Populated places on the North Branch Potomac River